Scenic Point is a  mountain summit located in the Two Medicine area of Glacier National Park, in Glacier County, Montana, United States. It is situated in the Lewis Range, six miles northwest of East Glacier Park Village, and approximately seven miles east of the Continental Divide, with precipitation runoff from the mountain draining into the Two Medicine River watershed. Access to the summit is via the Continental Divide National Scenic Trail which traverses the upper slopes of this mountain. The trail to Scenic Point was constructed by the Great Northern Railway, and the summit once hosted a locomotive bell, a Swiss Alps tradition. The mountain's name was officially adopted in 1929 by the United States Board on Geographic Names.

Geology 

The mountains in Glacier National Park are composed of sedimentary rock laid down during the Precambrian to Jurassic periods.

Climate 
According to the Köppen climate classification system, Scenic Point is located in an alpine subarctic climate zone with long, cold, snowy winters, and cool to warm summers. Winter temperatures can drop below −10 °F with wind chill factors below −30 °F. Due to its altitude, it receives precipitation all year, as snow in winter, and as thunderstorms in summer.

Gallery

See also

 Mountains and mountain ranges of Glacier National Park (U.S.)
 Geology of the Rocky Mountains

References

External links 
 Weather forecast: Scenic Point
 Scenic Point trail: Hikinginglacier.com

Mountains of Glacier County, Montana
Mountains of Glacier National Park (U.S.)
Lewis Range
Mountains of Montana
North American 2000 m summits